Mohd Rafiq bin Naizamohideen is a Malaysian politician who served as Member of the Melaka State Executive Council (EXCO) for the second term in the Barisan Nasional (BN) state administration under Chief Minister Sulaiman Md Ali from March 2020 to November 2021 and for the first term in the Pakatan Harapan (PH) state administration under former Chief Minister Adly Zahari from May 2018 to the collapse of the PH state administration in March 2020 as well as Member of the Melaka State Legislative Assembly (MLA) for Paya Rumput from May 2018 to November 2021. He is also a member of the United Malays National Organisation (UMNO), a component party of the BN coalition. He was a member of the Malaysian United Indigenous Party (BERSATU), a component party of the Perikatan Nasional (PN) coalition and previously PH coalition. He served as the Vice President of BERSATU from August 2020 to his resignation in October 2022, State Chairman of PN and BERSATU of Melaka from January 2021 to his resignations in November 2021.

On 30 October 2022, Rafiq resigned from the BERSATU party positions and left the party over his disappointment of the seat distribution for the 2022 general election. On 16 February 2023, Rafiq rejoined UMNO after leaving it seven years ago.

Election results

Honours 
  :
  Companion Class I of the Exalted Order of Malacca (DMSM) – Datuk (2018)
  Knight Commander of the Exalted Order of Malacca (DCSM) – Datuk Wira (2021)

References 

1986 births
Living people
People from Johor
Malaysian people of Malay descent
Malaysian Muslims
Former Malaysian United Indigenous Party politicians
Members of the Malacca State Legislative Assembly
Malacca state executive councillors
21st-century Malaysian politicians
Former United Malays National Organisation politicians
Independent politicians in Malaysia